James Watt's Mad Machine is a set of sculptural railings and gates at Winson Green Metro station, Winson Green, Birmingham, England, designed by Tim Tolkien, supported by Eric Klein Velderman, Paula Woof and pupils at James Watt Infants and Junior Schools, with whose site it forms a boundary. It was created in 1998.

It is inspired by the inventions of James Watt, who lived and worked nearby.

External links
Transport Authority description and pictures

History of Birmingham, West Midlands
Outdoor sculptures in England
Transport in Birmingham, West Midlands
Sculptures in Birmingham, West Midlands